was a Japanese pioneer of otorhinolaryngology and professor at Fukuoka Medical School (now part of Kyushu University).

Four years later he returned to Japan, where he took up the post of professor at Fukuoka Medical School.

His wife, was a haiku poet from Matsuyama. As Kubo was a well-known poet too, their home in Fukuoka soon became the social center for poets in Northern Kyushu while attracting poets and novelists from afar.

One of his patient was Takashi Nagatsuka the poet.
Kubo was one of the pioneers of otorhinolaryngology in Japan, and was selected as a representative of his country for the first International Congress of Oto-Rhino-Laryngology at Copenhagen (1913). In 1934 he was awarded the Légion d'honneur.

Kubo was famous for his - and -poetry, started as a pupil of Kyoshi Takahama. As a poet he found a mentor in Naobumi Ochiai, with Saishu Onoe formed Ikazuchi kai, and created friendship with Byakuren Yanagihara. In February 1913, Kubo began publishing a magazine  for his circle of poets and haiku. It was in its May issue that Byakuren Yanagihara contributed her work  (Himomo, peach flowers in bright pink), and in the same issue, Kubo and his wife also published their workes as well; Inokichi  (Thinking about 'Alt-Heidelberg') and Yorie  (Sailing down Tsukushi river).

There is a small museum at Kyushu University honouring his achievements.

Book for Dr. Ino Kubo's 60th Birthday

A book to commemorate Dr. Inokichi Kubo's 60th birthday was dedicated by his friends and colleagues in the field of otorhinolaryngology, titled with his nickname as "Ino Kubo". Numerous notable researchers and practitioners contributed.

References

External links
 Biography published by Nishi-Nippon City Bank Retrieved 30 May 2010. 
 Biography published by Nihonmatsu City Retrieved 30 May 2010. 
 Kyushu University information Retrieved 30 May 2010. 

1939 deaths
1874 births
Japanese surgeons
Otolaryngologists
Recipients of the Legion of Honour
Academic staff of Kyushu University